Cattanooga Cats is an American animated television series produced by Hanna-Barbera which aired on ABC from September 6, 1969, to September 4, 1971.

The show was a package program similar to the Hanna-Barbera/NBC show The Banana Splits, except that it contained no live-action segments. During the 1969–1970 season, Cattanooga Cats ran one hour and contained four segments: Cattanooga Cats, Around the World in 79 Days, It's the Wolf! and Motormouse and Autocat. During the 1970–1971 season, It's the Wolf! and Motormouse and Autocat were spun off into a half-hour show. Around the World in 79 Days remained as part of Cattanooga Cats, which was reduced to a half-hour. Motormouse and Autocat ran concurrently with Cattanooga Cats until both met their demise at the end of the 1970–1971 season.

Premise

Cattanooga Cats
Cattanooga Cats depicted the adventures of a fictitious rock band similar to The Archies and The Banana Splits populated by anthropomorphic hillbilly cats consisting of:
 Lead singer/guitarist Country (voiced by Bill Callaway)
 Singer/dancer Kitty Jo (voiced by Julie Bennett)
 Bassist Scoots (voiced by Jim Begg)
 Drummer Groove (voiced by Casey Kasem)

A fifth member, a mouse keyboardist named "Cheesie", was storyboarded but cut out of the series. The group traveled around in a van, was chased by a female cat groupie named Chessie, the "Autograph Hound" (also voiced by Julie Bennett) and Kitty Jo owned a big blue dog named "Teeny Tim". The singing vocals for The Cattanooga Cats were performed by Michael Lloyd and Peggy Clinger. Producer Mike Curb was the musical director for the series and co-wrote all the songs performed by the Cattanooga Cats. Ted Nichols composed the background music.  An LP, Cattanooga Cats (Forward ST-F-1018), featuring some of the songs used in the series, was released in 1969.

The Cats also appeared in various "bumpers" between the other cartoons, but they were best remembered for their animated musical segments. These cartoons showed a strong psychedelic and op-art influence and the Cattanooga Cats remain a cult favorite to this day.

Episodes
Only nine cartoon story segments featuring the characters were produced.

Around the World in 79 Days
Loosely based upon the novel Around the World in Eighty Days by Jules Verne, this was an adventure segment involving balloonist Phineas "Finny" Fogg Jr. (voiced by Bruce Watson) is conceived as the great-great-grandson from America of the main character Phileas Fogg in the novel. Reporter teenagers Jenny Trent (voiced by Janet Waldo) and Hoppy (voiced by Don Messick) and he set out on a globetrotting adventure to travel around the world in 79 days and beat the original record set by Finny's ancestor. The trio is in competition for both the record and a £1,000,000 prize against the sinister Crumden (voiced by Daws Butler), who supposedly was the butler of the original Phileas. Crumden is aided by his idiotic chauffeur Bumbler (voiced by Allan Melvin) and his pet monkey Smirky (voiced by Don Messick). Unlike the other segments, Around the World in 79 Days was a serial with a continuing story, but as with many shows made during this period, it has no specific ending.

Episodes

It's the Wolf!
It's the Wolf! followed the comic exploits of Mildew Wolf (voiced by Paul Lynde), who aspires to catch and eat a sure-footed lamb named Lambsy (voiced by Daws Butler). The wolf is always thwarted by a sheep dog (voiced by Allan Melvin) named Bristlehound. Bristlehound would apprehend Mildew (usually after hearing Lambsy cry out, "It's the wool-uff!"), pound him, and toss him sailing into the air, with Mildew screaming a phrase such as "Spoilsport!" as he flies into the horizon and lands with a thud.

Episodes

Motormouse and Autocat
Essentially a motor-racing version of Tom and Jerry, this segment involved the antics of a race car-driving cat named Autocat (voiced by Marty Ingels) and a motorcycle-driving mouse named Motormouse (voiced by Dick Curtis). Much of the segment's appeal lay in the bizarre cars that Autocat devised in his attempts to catch Motormouse, and in the unusual character voices and dialect. For example, Motormouse would often over enunciate words, saying things like "Chi-co-ry", and greeting Autocat with a friendly "Hey there, Au-to-cat". Motormouse resembled Pixie and Dixie in character design.

Episodes

Voice cast
 Paul Lynde – Mildew Wolf
 Daws Butler – Lambsy, Crumden
 Allan Melvin – Bristlehound, Bumbler 
 Bill Callaway – Country
 Jim Begg – Scoots
 Julie Bennett – Kitty Jo, Chessie
 Mel Blanc – Additional voices
 Casey Kasem – Groove
 Dick Curtis – Motormouse
 June Foray – Additional voices
 Paul Frees – Additional voices
 Marty Ingels – Autocat
 Don Messick – Hoppy, Smirky, Opening Announcer
 Jean Vander Pyl – Additional voices
 Hal Smith – Additional voices
 John Stephenson – Additional voices
 Ginny Tyler – Additional voices
 Janet Waldo – Jenny
 Bruce Watson – Phineas "Finny" Fogg Jr.
 Paul Winchell – Additional voices

Epilogue
Hanna-Barbera had high hopes for Cattanooga Cats to be a hit program, like The Banana Splits, but the show failed to attract a large audience during its original run. Mildew Wolf, the most popular character on the program, resurfaced six years after the cancellation of Cattanooga Cats as co-host (with Snagglepuss) on Laff-A-Lympics, this time voiced by John Stephenson impersonating Paul Lynde. Lambsy appeared in the television film Yogi's Ark Lark. Sky One occasionally broadcast Cattanooga Cats shorts in the UK in 1990, the segments were shown in complete isolation, broadcast neither as part of the original show or a new compilation.

Reruns of the show were not seen until the program began airing as part of the Boomerang programming block on Cartoon Network, which later became a spin-off network of its own. For several months, Boomerang UK channel ran the musical interludes from the show, all of which ran to exactly 1 minute 45 seconds, as short (and unidentified) fillers before closing down at midnight. When the channel expanded to 24 hours, these interludes were dropped. The complete show has not been seen in the UK in recent years.

Other appearances
The Cattanooga Cats, Teeny Tim, Lambsy, Mildew Wolf & Bristlehound appeared in the HBO Max original series Jellystone! with Country voiced by Scott Whyte, Kitty Jo voiced by Georgie Kidder, Lambsy voiced by Dana Snyder, and Mildew Wolf voiced by Bernardo de Paula. The Cattanooga Cats and Teeny Tim are portrayed as animatronics of the Cattanooga Cheese Explosion pizzeria where the Cattanooga Cats are an animatronic band and Teeny Tim is a robot waiter. Lambsy is implied to be Jewish in the season 2 episode "Yogi's Midlife Crisis" as Yogi's band appears to be performing at a Bar Mitzvah and Lambsy declares himself to be a man.

Home media
Warner Archive has yet to release the series on DVD.

Soundtrack

A soundtrack album for the series was released in 1969, containing eleven of the show's songs with the lead vocals performed by Michael Lloyd and Peggy Clinger. The songs "Mother May I" and "Merry-Go-Round" were also released as singles to coincide with the series and album, with "Johnny Johnny Jump-Up" and "Country Carnival" as their respective b-sides. The songwriters were uncredited on the album but were credited on the accompanying singles. Curb Records, the eventual successor to Forward Records (owned by noted record producer Mike Curb), most likely owns the master tapes of the Cattanooga Cats album. Curb likewise has not expressed plans to re-release the Cattanooga Cats album.

Track listing

Side 1

Side 2

Other songs
In addition to the album, other songs were featured in the series that were not released in any format.

 "Cash Register Romance" (Michael Lloyd)
 "Children Understand" (Valjean Johns, Guy Hemric)
 "Cold Wisconsin Night" (Lloyd)
 "Come and Play with the Cattanooga Cats" (Mike Curb, Hemric)
 "Come Back, Baby, Come Back" (Lloyd, Hemric)
 "Daydream" (Lloyd)
 "The Day When Love Won't Stay Away" (Lloyd, Shaun Harris)
 "Do You Dig the Music" (Johnny Cymbal)
 "Honey" (Lloyd, Hemric)
 "Hoot Owl" (Harley Hatcher)
 "I Want to Sleep Tonight" (Hatcher)
 "I Wish I Was a Fire" (Lloyd)
 "It's Summertime" (Cymbal)
 "Love Could Be" (Lloyd, Peggy Clinger)
 "Magic Machine" (Lloyd)
 "Pretty as a Picture" (Lloyd, Curb)
 "She Sure Got Soul" (Jerry Styner, Roger Christian)
 "She's the Right One" (Curb, Christian)
 "Sing a Song of Sixpence" (Lloyd, Styner, Hemric)
 "Stop Right There" (Lloyd)
 "The Story of My Life" (Lloyd)
 "Super Love" (Styner, Christian)
 "Up, Down, And on the Ground" (Lloyd, Clinger)
 "We're Incompatible" (Lloyd, Christian)

References

External links
 
 
 
 Cattanooga Cats according to Wingnut
 Motormouse and Autocat at Don Markstein's Toonopedia. Archived from the original on April 7, 2012.

1960s American animated television series
1970s American animated television series
1960s American anthology television series
1970s American anthology television series
1960s American musical comedy television series
1970s American musical comedy television series
1969 American television series debuts
1971 American television series endings
American Broadcasting Company original programming
American children's animated anthology television series
American children's animated comedy television series
American children's animated musical television series
Animated musical groups
Animated television series about cats
English-language television shows
Television series about wolves
Television series by Hanna-Barbera